Barry Kent Goodwin is an American economist, currently the Wm Neal Reynolds Distinguished Professor at North Carolina State University.

Career 
Barry Goodwin is the William Neal Reynolds Distinguished Professor and Graduate Alumni Distinguished Professor in the Departments of Agricultural and Resource Economics and Economics. 

He has held faculty positions at Kansas State University and the Ohio State University. His research and teaching activities are focused on applied economics, policy, trade, and econometrics.

References

External links

Year of birth missing (living people)
Living people
North Carolina State University faculty
American economists
North Carolina State University alumni